Dal biji is an Indian snack made of crispy gram flour noodles, pink masoor dal and cantaloupe seeds and musk melon seeds.

References 

Indian snack foods